CO or variants may refer to:

Chemistry 
 Carbon monoxide (CO), a colorless, odorless, and tasteless gas 
 Carbonyl group, composed of a carbon atom double-bonded to an oxygen atom: C=O
 Cobalt, a chemical element, symbol Co

Computing and telecommunications 
 .co (second-level domain), the Internet second-level domain meaning "commercial"
 .co, the Internet country code top-level domain (ccTLD) for Colombia
 Commitment ordering (CO), a concurrency control technique for databases
 Telephone exchange, or central office (CO)

Mathematics 
 Cofunction, or Co, in trigonometry
 Cuboctahedron, a uniform polyhedron

People
 Nguyễn Hữu Có (1925–2012), Vietnamese general
 Conrado Co (born 1940), Filipino badminton player
 Alfredo Co (born 1949), Filipino Sinologist
 Atoy Co (born 1951), Filipino actor and basketball coach
 Leonard Co (1953–2010), Filipino botanist
 Nando Có (born 1973), Bissau-Guinean footballer 
 Kenedy Có (born 1998), Bissau-Guinean footballer 
 Samuel S. Co, Filipino politician

Places 
 CO postcode area, or Colchester postcode area, England
 Colombia, ISO 3166-1 country code CO
 Colorado, United States postal abbreviation CO
 Counties of Ireland, abbreviated Co.

Ranks and titles 
 C.O., post-nominal initials of members of the congregation of the Oratory of Saint Philip Neri
 C/O, cadet officer ranks of the Junior Reserve Officers' Training Corps
 Commanding officer (CO), the officer in command of a military unit
 Contracting Officer (CO or KO), in the U.S. government
 Correctional officer (CO), an officer whose duty it is to safeguard and promote the welfare of inmates
 Circle officer  (CO), in the Indian government
 Conscientious objector

Transportation 
 Chemins de fer Orientaux (CO), a former Ottoman railway company
 Chesapeake and Ohio Railway (C&O or CO), a former American railroad
 Cobalt Air (IATA airline designator CO), a Cypriot airline from 2016
 Continental Airlines (IATA airline designator CO), an American airline before 2012

Other uses 
 co-, an English prefix meaning coming together
 Cardiac output (CO), the volume of blood being pumped by the heart per time unit
 Castres Olympique, a French rugby club
 Certificate of occupancy (CO), a legal document
 Certificate of origin (often abbreviated to C/O or CoO), in international trade
 Company, abbreviated co.
 Corsican language, ISO 639-1 language code co
 ℅, a Unicode character in the Letterlike Symbols block
 c/o, former name of Gerhardsen Gerner, an art gallery in Berlin

See also 
 C0 (disambiguation), the letternumber combination
 Care of (disambiguation)
 Co-Co locomotives